Malta participated in the Junior Eurovision Song Contest 2021, held in Paris, France. The Maltese broadcaster Public Broadcasting Services (PBS) was responsible for the country's participation in the contest, and organized a national final to select the Maltese entry.

Background 

Prior to the  contest, Malta had participated in the Junior Eurovision Song Contest sixteen times since their first participation in the inaugural  contest. In the  contest, Malta was represented by the song "Chasing Sunsets" performed by Chanel Monseigneur. The song placed 8th out of 12 entries with 100 points.

Before Junior Eurovision

Malta Junior Eurovision Song Contest 2021 

Malta's participation in the contest was confirmed by PBS in August 2021. PBS organised the national final Malta Junior Eurovision Song Contest 2021 to select the Maltese entry.

Competing entries 
Artists were able to submit their entries between 26 July and 5 September 2021, with the plan originally being to select 12 competing participants, to be announced on 19 September 2021. However, due to the unprecedented high number of submissions, 20 shortlisted songs were revealed on 19 September, which were cut down to twelve in the following week.

Final

The final will take place on 16 October 2021 at the Robert Samut Hall in Floriana, hosted by Elaine Saliba Bonnici. The winner was selected by the votes of a jury panel (50%) and public televoting (50%). The jury consisted of Maltese Junior Eurovision Song Contest 2015 winner and Eurovision Song Contest 2021 entrant Destiny Chukunyere, singer Maxine Pace and musician Sigmund Mifsud. The interval act featured Destiny performing "".

"My Home" performed by Ike and Kaya was announced as the winner of the national final. The song was composed by Cyprian Cassar and lyricised by Owen Leuellen and MUXU. The duo previously participated in the competition Malta's Got Talent in 2020, where they were praised for their energy and musicality. They achieved 4th place in the competition. Kaya had also participated in Malta Junior Eurovision Song Contest as a solo act in 2020, with the song "Made of Stars".

At Junior Eurovision 
After the opening ceremony, which took place on 13 December 2021, it was announced that Malta would perform fourth on 19 December 2021, following Poland and preceding Italy.

At the end of the contest, Malta received 97 points, placing 12th out of 19 participating countries.

Voting

Detailed voting results

References 

Malta
2021
Junior Eurovision Song Contest